Guadalupe County Courthouse may refer to:

Guadalupe County Courthouse in Santa Rosa, Santa Rosa, New Mexico, a former courthouse listed on the National Register of Historic Places
Guadalupe County Courthouse in Puerto de Luna, New Mexico, which preceded the Santa Rosa one
Guadalupe County Courthouse (New Mexico), Santa Rosa, New Mexico, a current courthouse of the Fourth Judicial Court
Guadalupe County Courthouse (Texas), Seguin, Texas